Richard Shepherd (1942–2022) was a British Conservative politician.

Richard Shepherd may also refer to:

 Richard Shepherd (theologian) (1732–1809), English churchman, Archdeacon of Bedford in 1783
 Richard Herne Shepherd (1842–1895), English bibliographer
 Richard Shepherd, founder of Richard Shepherd Software
 Richard Shepherd (producer) (1927–2014), American film producer
 Richard Shepherd (chef) (1945–2022), won a Michelin star and then created a chain of successful brasseries
 Richard Shepherd, a character in the TV series Intruders
 Richard Shepherd, awarded the New Zealand Cross

See also
Richard Shepard (born 1965), American film director and screenwriter
Richard Sheppard (disambiguation)